Robert Gabriel Neagoe (born 28 May 1982, in Piteşti) is a Romanian former footballer.

External links
 
 
 

1982 births
Living people
Romanian footballers
CS Mioveni players
FC Steaua București players
FC Steaua II București players
FC Argeș Pitești players
ACF Gloria Bistrița players
Royal Antwerp F.C. players
FC Politehnica Iași (2010) players
ASIL Lysi players
FCV Farul Constanța players
AFC Dacia Unirea Brăila players
Expatriate footballers in Belgium
Romanian expatriate footballers
Liga I players
Liga II players
Association football midfielders